Area codes 617 and 857 are telephone area codes in the North American Numbering Plan (NANP) for the U.S. state of Massachusetts, serving the city of Boston and several surrounding communities such as Brookline, Cambridge, Newton and Quincy. Area code 617 is one of the original North American area codes created in October 1947, when it served the eastern two-thirds of Massachusetts, from roughly the western end of Worcester County to Cape Cod and the South Coast.

History
Massachusetts was the only New England state divided into multiple numbering plan areas (NPAs) when the American Telephone and Telegraph Company (AT&T) devised the first nationwide telephone numbering plan in 1947. Its most populous part, the eastern half received area code 617, while the rest of the state was served by area code 413.

In July 1988, most of the western, northern, and southern portions of the old 617 territory, including Worcester County, the Merrimack Valley, the South Coast, and the Cape and Islands, were split off as area code 508. Permissive dialing of 617 continued across eastern Massachusetts until January 1, 1989.

In 1997, the northern, western and southern portions of the new 617 split off as 781, which almost completely surrounds 617.  This reduced 617 to Boston itself and its closest neighboring communities. 

This was intended as a long-term solution, but within three years 617 was close to exhaustion once again due to the demand for more phone lines for auxiliary devices (mobile phones, fax machines, pagers, and BBS lines).  On May 2, 2001, 857 was overlaid onto 617. Since then, 10-digit local dialing has been mandatory.

Some mobile telephone numbers from the 1990s assigned to communities in the area surrounding 617 (which is now the 781 area code) kept the 617 area code after the split.

Area code 508 was split from 617 on July 16, 1988. Area code 978 subsequently split from 508 on September 1, 1997.

Area code 781 was split from 617 on September 1, 1997.

As of 2018, the 617/857 NPA is projected to be exhausted by 2041.

Service area

Counties
The numbering plan area 617/857 includes portions of the following counties:
Essex
Middlesex
Norfolk
Suffolk

Communities
It includes the following communities:
Belmont
Boston
Brookline
Cambridge
Chelsea
Everett
Milton
Newton
Quincy
Somerville
Watertown
Winthrop

Central office codes by location
The NPA includes central offices with the following prefix format 617-NXX:
 Belmont: 209, 404, 484, 486, 489, 672, 826, 855, 883, 932, 977, 993
 Boston Central: 204, 205, 210, 212, 217, 222, 223, 224, 226, 227, 228, 235, 236, 239, 246, 247, 248, 255, 259, 261, 262, 263, 266, 267, 275, 279, 283, 289, 292, 293, 295, 303, 304, 305, 306, 309, 310, 312, 314, 316, 320, 330, 331, 338, 341, 342, 343, 345, 346, 348, 350, 351, 352, 353, 356, 357, 358, 366, 367, 368, 369, 371, 372, 373, 375, 377, 378, 385, 391, 392, 399, 406, 407, 412, 413, 414, 416, 421, 422, 423, 424, 425, 426, 428, 429, 434, 437, 438, 439, 443, 447, 448, 449, 450, 451, 456, 457, 459, 470, 476, 478, 480, 482, 488, 490, 502, 504, 507, 510, 512, 513, 515, 517, 519, 521, 523, 526, 530, 531, 532, 534, 535, 536, 542, 543, 549, 556, 557, 563, 565, 570, 571, 572, 573, 574, 578, 579, 585, 587, 589, 590, 592, 593, 594, 595, 598, 603, 619, 620, 624, 626, 635, 636, 637, 638, 643, 645, 646, 648, 650, 654, 662, 664, 670, 671, 672, 680, 683, 686, 692, 694, 695, 697, 699, 717, 719, 720, 721, 722, 723, 724, 725, 726, 727, 728, 733, 737, 742, 743, 747, 748, 753, 755, 756, 757, 760, 763, 772, 777, 778, 780, 784, 785, 788, 790, 794, 799, 816, 818, 820, 823, 824, 828, 830, 832, 834, 835, 838, 839, 840, 848, 849, 850, 851, 854, 856, 859, 861, 865, 867, 869, 872, 875, 877, 878, 880, 888, 892, 894, 896, 897, 901, 904, 908, 912, 918, 919, 921, 927, 931, 933, 936, 937, 938, 939, 943, 946, 947, 948, 951, 954, 956, 959, 960, 961, 963, 973, 986, 988, 989, 994
 Brighton: 202, 206, 208, 254, 300, 319, 403, 415, 560, 562, 586, 746, 779, 782, 783, 787, 789, 817, 870, 891, 903, 925, 987
 Brookline: 232, 264, 274, 277, 278, 355, 383, 396, 432, 487, 505, 525, 566, 582, 608, 632, 651, 667, 677, 713, 730, 731, 732, 734, 735, 738, 739, 751, 754, 860, 879, 906, 935, 953, 975, 991, 992
 Cambridge: 201, 216, 218, 225, 229, 230, 233, 234, 245, 250, 251, 252, 253, 256, 258, 280, 290, 299, 301, 308, 324, 335, 339, 349, 354, 359, 374, 384, 386, 388, 395, 397, 401, 417, 430, 441, 444, 452, 453, 460, 465, 468, 475, 491, 492, 493, 494, 495, 496, 497, 498, 499, 500, 503, 520, 528, 540, 547, 550, 551, 575, 576, 577, 583, 588, 599, 613, 621, 642, 647, 649, 661, 665, 674, 679, 682, 685, 693, 703, 710, 714, 715, 758, 761, 768, 798, 800, 802, 803, 806, 812, 821, 836, 844, 852, 858, 864, 866, 868, 871, 873, 876, 899, 902, 909, 914, 940, 945, 949, 955, 976, 995, 998, 999
 Charlestown: 241, 242, 286, 337, 380, 398, 580, 669, 681, 712, 886, 952, 982
 Chelsea: 270, 336, 370, 409, 461, 466, 660, 819, 884, 887, 889, 958
 Dorchester: 265, 282, 287, 288, 297, 326, 379, 436, 446, 474, 506, 514, 533, 704, 707, 740, 822, 825, 905, 929, 979
 East Boston: 271, 418, 455, 561, 567, 568, 569, 634, 716, 874, 895, 913, 970, 981, 997
 Everett: 203, 294, 381, 382, 387, 389, 394, 410, 420, 544, 545, 601, 843, 917, 944
 Hyde Park (includes Readville and parts of Milton): 214, 272, 276, 333, 360, 361, 362, 364, 408, 604, 675, 705, 833, 910, 990
 Jamaica Plain (includes Roslindale and West Roxbury): 323, 325, 327, 344, 363, 390, 435, 469, 477, 522, 524, 553, 676, 942, 971, 983
 Melrose: 957
 Milton (includes Mattapan; see also Hyde Park): 273, 291, 296, 298, 313, 322, 433, 615, 690, 696, 698, 898, 907, 915, 922, 980
 Newton: 213, 215, 219, 243, 244, 332, 340, 431, 454, 467, 473, 485, 527, 546, 552, 558, 559, 564, 581, 584, 597, 609, 610, 614, 618, 630, 631, 641, 644, 655, 656, 658, 659, 663, 678, 762, 775, 795, 796, 831, 853, 862, 881, 882, 885, 893, 916, 928, 964, 965, 969
 Quincy: 221, 237, 249, 302, 317, 328, 347, 376, 405, 471, 472, 479, 481, 483, 509, 537, 639, 653, 657, 687, 689, 691, 706, 729, 745, 750, 769, 770, 773, 774, 786, 793, 801, 804, 829, 837, 842, 845, 847, 890, 934, 984, 985
 Roxbury: 238, 318, 400, 427, 442, 445, 516, 541, 602, 606, 652, 708, 749, 792, 989
 Saugus: 285
 Somerville: 284, 440, 501, 591, 616, 623, 625, 627, 628, 629, 666, 684, 702, 718, 741, 764, 767, 776, 863, 941, 996
 South Boston: 268, 269, 307, 315, 334, 463, 464, 596, 622, 701, 752, 765, 766
 Watertown: 231, 321, 393, 402, 458, 600, 607, 612, 668, 673, 744, 923, 924, 926, 972
 Winthrop: 207, 329, 539, 841, 846

The NPA includes central offices with the following prefix format 857-NXX:
 Belmont: 373, 626
 Boston Central: 201, 204, 205, 207, 221, 222, 238, 241, 254, 257, 272, 277, 284, 288, 294, 319, 334, 350, 355, 362, 366, 383, 413, 445, 449, 453, 472, 488, 654, 753, 869, 891, 931, 991, 996
 Brighton: 498, 540, 559, 919
 Brookline: 218, 225, 234, 245, 307, 364, 576
 Cambridge: 209, 253, 550, 600, 756, 829, 928, 940, 976, 998
 Charlestown: 389, 452, 588
 Chelsea: 776
 Dorchester: 212, 217, 220
 East Boston: 574
 Everett: 363, 888
 Hyde Park: 342, 345
 Jamaica Plain: 203, 547, 719, 728
 Milton: 598
 Newton: 226, 229, 231, 232, 255, 404, 636
 Quincy: 252, 403, 499, 526, 939
 Roxbury: 399, 492, 544
 Somerville: 227, 523, 995, 997
 South Boston: 401, 496, 524
 Watertown: 228
 Winthrop: 201, 816

N11 codes

 2-1-1: United Way Worldwide (UWW) and the Alliance for Information and Referral Systems (AIRS)
 3-1-1: Used in Newton, Boston, and elsewhere for 3-1-1 services.
 4-1-1: directory assistance
 5-1-1: traffic information or police non-emergency services
 6-1-1: unused (on landlines)
 7-1-1: TDD relay (MassRelay) for the deaf
 8-1-1: underground public utility location (Dig Safe),
 9-1-1: emergency services

See also
 List of area codes in Massachusetts

References

External links

 Massachusetts Area Code Map, Mass. Department of Telecommunications and Cable
 
 
 
 

1947 establishments in Massachusetts
2001 establishments in Massachusetts
617
617
Telecommunications-related introductions in 1947
Telecommunications-related introductions in 2001